Anthony Maurice Honoré,  (30 March 1921 – 26 February 2019) was a British lawyer and jurist, known for his work on ownership, causation and Roman law.

Biography

Honoré was born in London but was brought up in South Africa. He served in the South African Infantry during the Second World War and was severely wounded in the Battle of Alamein. After the war he continued his studies at New College, Oxford, and he lived and taught in Oxford for seventy years, including periods as a Fellow of The Queen's College and then of New College. Between 1971 and 1988 he was Regius Professor of Civil Law at Oxford and a Fellow of All Souls College, Oxford; for nearly 30 years after retiring from his Chair, he taught seminars in Jurisprudence for the BCL jointly with John Gardner.

Honoré was a close associate of H. L. A. Hart. They jointly wrote Causation in the Law (Oxford, 1st ed. 1959, 2nd 1985) in 1953-8 and Honoré had some influence on Hart's The Concept of Law (Oxford, 1st ed. 1961, 2nd 1994). A number of his philosophical papers are collected in Making Law Bind (Oxford, 1987) and Responsibility and Fault (Oxford, 1999) and his contributions to legal philosophy and Roman law, which range widely, include 16 books and more than a 100 articles published over six decades.

Honoré was an honorary Q.C. and Bencher of Lincoln's Inn, a member of the British and Bavarian Academies and of the International Academy of Comparative Law. In South Africa, his standing has been recognised by the award of honorary degrees from the Universities of South Africa, Stellenbosch and Cape Town. When receiving this last degree, in 1990, he had the opportunity to give an address. He used this opportunity to point to the parallel between the extension of citizenship to all free people in the Roman Empire, regardless of race, sex or religion, by Caracalla in 211 AD, and the extension of citizenship to the whole of the South African population. This he foresaw would need an adjustment of the legal system, and he suggested a constitutional court to carry it through with a parallel to the composition of the German Constitutional Court. Nelson Mandela approved of this. It was put into practice in 1995, and has been a success.

He delivered the Hamlyn Lectures (1982), the Blackstone and H. L. A. Hart lectures, the J. H. Gray lectures at Cambridge and the Maccabaean lecture in Jurisprudence at the British Academy. Three Festschriften have been published in his honour.

 Neil MacCormick and Peter Birks (eds., 1985) The Legal Mind: Essays for Tony Honoré;
 Peter Cane and John Gardner (eds., 2001) Relating to Responsibility: Essays in Honor of Tony Honoré on his 80th Birthday.
 Daniel Visser and Max Loubser (eds., 2011) Thinking about Law: Essays for Tony Honore;

On 17 September 2004 he received honorary citizenship from the then mayor of San Ginesio, Pietro Enrico Parrucci.

List of publications
Books
 Gaius: a biography (Oxford, 1962) 
 Tribonian (London, 1978) 
 Sex Law in England (London: Duckworth, 1978) 
 Emperor and Lawyers: with a paligenesia of third-century imperial rescripts 193–305 AD (London, 1st ed. 1981; Oxford, 2nd ed. 1994) 
 Ulpian: pioneer of human rights (Oxford, 1st ed. 1982; 2nd ed. 2002) 
 The Quest for Security: Employees, Tenants, Wives (London: Stevens, 1982) 
 Causation in the Law (Oxford, 1st ed. 1959; 2nd 1985) – with H. L. A. Hart 
 Making Law Bind (Oxford, 1987)
 Concordance to the Digest Jurists (Oxford: OMP, 1980) – with J. Menner
 About Law: an introduction (Oxford, 1995)
 Law in the Crisis of the Empire 379–455 AD: the Theodosian dynasty and its quaestors (Oxford, 1998)
 Responsibility and Fault (Oxford, 1999)
 Justinian's Digest: character and compilation (Oxford, 2010)

Articles
 "Responsibility and luck: the moral basis of strict liability" (1988) 104 Law Quarterly Review 530

References

External links
 Tony Honoré 1921– 2019 Memorial notice from the Oxford Law faculty, by John Gardner. from 7 March 2019. (link)
Tony Honoré (F, 1938) – RIP Memorial from the Diocesan College alumni network site from 26 February 2019.
Tony Honoré's web site. Includes several online papers and brief biographical details.

1921 births
2019 deaths
Philosophers of law
Members of Lincoln's Inn
Alumni of New College, Oxford
Fellows of New College, Oxford
Fellows of The Queen's College, Oxford
Fellows of All Souls College, Oxford
University of Cape Town alumni
Regius Professors of Civil Law (University of Oxford)
Honorary King's Counsel
Fellows of the British Academy
South African Army officers
British expatriates in South Africa
Academics of the University of Nottingham